The Scoundrel may refer to:

 The Scoundrel (play), a 1924 play by Hans Reimann and Toni Impekoven
 The Scoundrel (1931 film), a German film
 The Scoundrel (1935 film), an American film
 The Scoundrel (1939 film), a German film
 The Scoundrel (1988 film), an Azerbaijani film
 Enough Stupidity in Every Wise Man, an 1868 play also known as The Scoundrel

See also
 Scoundrels (disambiguation)